Kottelatia brittani is a species of cyprinid fish native to Sumatra and peninsular Malaysia. It is the only species recognized in its genus.

References

 

Leuciscinae
Freshwater fish of Sumatra
Freshwater fish of Malaysia
Fish described in 1976